Union Bank or Unionbank may refer to:

 Unionbank, an Austrian bank active created in 1870, merged into Allgemeine Bodencreditanstalt in 1927
 Union Bank (Albania)
 Union Bank of Australia, became part of Australia and New Zealand Banking Group
 Union Bank Limited (Bangladesh)
 Union Bank of California, now named MUFG Union Bank
 Union Bank of Halifax, Nova Scotia
 Union Bank of Hong Kong, now named Industrial and Commercial Bank of China (Asia) 
 Union Bank of India
 Union Bank of Israel
 Union Bank (Jordan), a bank in the Arab world
 Union Bank of London, later National Provincial Bank
 Union Bank (Morrisville, Vermont)
   Union Bank of New London, earliest predecessor of failed Bank of New England (Massachusetts)
 Union Bank of Nigeria
 Union Bank of Norway, branded as Sparebanken NOR
 Unionbank (Philippines), a Philippine bank created in 1968
 Union Bank (Pakistan)
 Union Bank (Pembrokeshire), England
 Union Bank of Scotland, now part of Bank of Scotland
 Union Bank of Switzerland
 Union Bank (Tallahassee, Florida)
 Union Bank of Taiwan
 Union Bank & Trust Company of Nebraska
 Unionbank or MKB Unionbank, a Bulgarian bank from 1996 to 2014
 MUFG Union Bank, mainly operating on U.S. west coast

See also
 Union Banks, large drowned atoll in South China Sea
 Union Bank F.C., Nigerian association football club
 Union Banking Corporation
 The Union Bank (1828), India
 Union Bank Building (disambiguation)
 Union Commercial Bank (disambiguation)
 Union State Bank (disambiguation)
 The Bank of Union, acquired by BancFirst January 24, 2014